Päivi Maria Räsänen, née Kuvaja (born 19 December 1959, in Sonkajärvi, Finland), is a Finnish politician. The chairwoman of the Christian Democrats from 2004 to 2015, she was the Minister of the Interior of Finland between 2011 and 2015.

A physician by education, Räsänen entered politics in the early 1990s, running for parliament in 1991. She has been in the Riihimäki City Council since 1993, and in the Finnish Parliament since 1995. She was elected the chairperson of the Christian Democrats on 2 October 2004. Following the government formation after the 2011 election, which led to the Christian Democrats joining the government, Räsänen was nominated by the party as the Minister of the Interior in the 72nd Finnish Cabinet led by Jyrki Katainen, and she was inaugurated along with the government on 22 June 2011.

Career and political positions
Räsänen has been characterized as a conservative. In 2004, she authored a small theological booklet concerning sexual related topics. In 2020, the head of a church body which distributed the booklet was investigated for incitement under 2011 changes to a minority protection law.

On 12 October 2010, Räsänen was one of the participants on a live TV debate on Ajankohtainen kakkonen'''s Homoilta special, with the topic of same-sex marriage and LGBT rights. As a protest, nearly 40,000 members left the state Evangelical Lutheran Church through the website eroakirkosta.fi over the next several weeks. At the time, this was the largest of such protests. Räsänen was on the show representing her party and herself as a Christian individual along with five other proponents of heterosexual rather than homosexual marriage. The church membership resignations were attributed by the media as a protest against her and then-Minister of Culture and Sports Stefan Wallin. Räsänen thinks homosexual acts are a sin and she herself does not consider her views "specifically extreme".

When interviewed by Ylioppilaslehti'' on 29 October 2010, Räsänen said that she would favor Christians over Muslims when selecting asylum seekers to Finland due, in her opinion, to Muslims' "difficulties to adjust to the Finnish culture". Her comments were condemned as "incomprehensible and merciless" by then-Minister of Migration and European Affairs Astrid Thors and then-Minister of Culture and Sports Stefan Wallin. Räsänen responded to the criticism, saying her comments were misinterpreted, since she did not consider religion as the main criterion for asylum seekers' admissions, but instead she wanted to highlight the benefits of refugees' integration through religious connections. In practice, as minister in charge of immigration affairs Räsänen has advocated for increasing the number of refugees taken in by Finland, especially from Syria.

In September 2012, Räsänen appointed a religiously conservative applicant, considered less qualified by the media, among six candidates to Permanent Secretary in the Ministry of Interior Affairs, which created considerable debate, especially as she had previously condemned political appointments of government officials.

During parliamentary proceedings for Finland's application to join NATO, Räsänen stated:
At great turning points in history, it has taken determination and courage to act, but also humility in the face of the unknown. It is known that the human equipment of the most effective is limited. "Except the Lord keep the city, the watchman waketh but in vain." That is why even today we need the same protection that Mannerheim reminded in his daily devotional order: "May God protect Finland."

Trial 
In 2019, she was investigated for incitement after criticizing the Evangelical Lutheran Church of Finland's official participation in LGBT Pride celebration events. In April 2021,  Finnish Prosecutor General
Raija Toiviainen announced that three separate charges of incitement against a minority group were being filed against her. The charges fell under a chapter of Finnish law which criminalizes "war crimes and crimes against humanity" and each charge can result in a prison sentence up to two years. The first part of her trial was held on 24 January 2022 and the second part of her trial was held on 14 February. The trial attracted international media, and the statements and testimonies of both the first and second parts of the trial and also the court's decision was live-blogged in English by Christian Network Europe. Evangelical Lutheran Mission Diocese of Finland bishop Juhana Pohjola was tried along with Räsänen; Pohjola was tried as the publisher of the 2004 booklet. At the start of the proceedings, the prosecution asked for a day-fine of at least 120 days for Räsänen, 60 days for Pohjola, and a community fine of at least 10,000 euros for the Luther Foundation. An additional demand from the prosecution was for the Luther Foundation to remove the text of Räsänen's pamphlet from the internet and for the Finnish public broadcasting company Yle to remove certain passages from Ruben Stiller’s radio interview with panelists discussing the question of "What would Jesus think of homosexuals?".

Representatives of 45 Lutheran church bodies called on the Finnish government to not prosecute her. She was likewise supported by the European Evangelical Alliance and the Spanish Evangelical Alliance. Five senators from the United States warned the United States Ambassador-at-Large for International Religious Freedom that the decision to prosecute them risked creating a "secular blasphemy law" to persecute Christians, Muslims, and Jews. Ten academics from the United States signed an open letter to the United States Commission on International Religious Freedom stating that the "prosecutions are straightforward acts of oppression".

The District Court found her and Pohjola not guilty of all charges and ordered the prosecution to pay their legal costs on 30 March 2022. In response to the ruling, the prosecutor Anu Mantila stated that the District Court "interpreted the statements differently than the prosecution and that's why they viewed that the limits of freedom of speech weren't breached... It’s my impression that this is because the elements that infringed on equality and the prohibition of discrimination weren't taken into consideration accordingly." Mantila stated that the verdict was incorrect and unjust and said there was "a high probability" she would appeal it. Later the prosecutor's office publicly announced an intent to appeal, which it did on April 29, 2022. Räsänen estimated that judicial proceedings "will take at least one year, I suppose, perhaps many more years".

Stance on abortion 
Räsänen opposes abortion. Räsänen contrasted abortion law to animal protection law saying that the latter gives better protection for animals than the former does to human fetuses: "The law on animal protection gives better protection to an animal about to be put down than the law on abortion does to an unborn child. It is forbidden to cause the animal pain when slaughtering it, but no one dares to even discuss the painfulness of abortion. Abortion is defended on the grounds that the fetus is not a human person, even though it is a biological human individual from the moment of conception."

About 6,500 abortion rights supporters formally renounced their state church membership in the first six days following the controversy. The average number leaving had been 70 persons a day previously.

Personal life
Räsänen is married to a Lutheran pastor, has five children, and ten grandchildren. She lives in Riihimäki. Räsänen is a physician and holds a Licentiate of Medicine.

See also

References

External links

Home page
Parliament of Finland: Päivi Räsänen 

1959 births
Living people
People from Sonkajärvi
Finnish Lutherans
Leaders of political parties in Finland
Christian Democrats (Finland) politicians
Ministers of the Interior of Finland
Members of the Parliament of Finland (1995–99)
Members of the Parliament of Finland (1999–2003)
Members of the Parliament of Finland (2003–07)
Members of the Parliament of Finland (2007–11)
Members of the Parliament of Finland (2011–15)
Members of the Parliament of Finland (2015–19)
Members of the Parliament of Finland (2019–23)
20th-century Finnish physicians
Women government ministers of Finland
Female interior ministers
21st-century Finnish women politicians
Women members of the Parliament of Finland